TeamLease Skills University is a private university in Tarsali, Vadodara, Gujarat. It is the first fully vocational education and training university in India. Though it is a private university, it was created in a public-private partnership between the Government of Gujarat and TeamLease Services Limited, one of India's largest staffing and recruitment agencies. The university has agreements with the Gujarat government and Labour Ministry of India to provide and promote apprenticeship.

References

External links 

Private universities in India
Universities in Gujarat
Vadodara district
2013 establishments in Gujarat
Educational institutions established in 2013